Rock the World is the fourth album by the British pop group Five Star. It was released in 1988 and reached #17 on the UK charts.

Two singles from the album were UK Top 30 hits: "Another Weekend" and "Rock My World". Two further singles from the album, "There's a Brand New World" and "Let Me Be Yours", failed to reach the Top 40. Following its release, the album was awarded a Silver disc for selling more than 60,000 copies in the UK.

The group adopted a new image for the release of the album, mimicking the leather-clad look from Michael Jackson's "Bad", released the previous year.

An expanded version of Rock the World was released by Cherry Pop Records in April 2012.

Track listing
"Another Weekend" (Leon Sylvers III) – 5:21
"Rock My World" (Leon Sylvers III) – 4:12
"Godsend" (Simon Climie, Rob Fisher, Dennis Morgan) – 4:17
"Are You Really the One" (Lionel Job, Clifford Dawson, William Hagans) – 4:05
"Let Me Be Yours" (Deniece Pearson) – 4:11
"Free Time" (Leon Sylvers III) – 4:46
"Physical Attraction" (Jerry Knight, Aaron Zigman) – 3:55
"Someone's in Love" (Doris Pearson, Delroy Pearson) – 4:23 (US edition 4:08 radio remix) *
"There's a Brand New World" (Deniece Pearson) – 3:49
"Rescue Me" (Leon Sylvers III) – 4:19
"Another Weekend" (Friday night mix) – 6:28 (not on LP)
"Rock My World" (Extra terrestrial mix) – 6:39 (not on LP)
* For the US edition (cat 8531-2-R) the track "Someone's in Love" was replaced by the 4:08 7" radio remix version of the song,even though the disc label was still printed with the UK version timing of 4:23.

2012 CD bonus tracks
 "Another Weekend" (Saturday night mix)
 "Rock My World" (Extra terrestrial dub)
 "There's a Brand New World" (12" version)
 "Let Me Be Yours "(12" remix)
 "Someone's in Love" (David Morales US 7" radio mix)
 "With Every Heartbeat" (7" mix)
 "Something About My Baby"

Five Star albums
1988 albums
Albums produced by Leon Sylvers III